Myosin-3 is a protein that in humans is encoded by the MYH3 gene.

Function 

Myosin is a major contractile protein which converts chemical energy into mechanical energy through the hydrolysis of ATP. Myosin is a hexameric protein composed of a pair of myosin heavy chains (MYH) and two pairs of nonidentical light chains. This gene is a member of the MYH family and encodes a protein with an IQ domain and a myosin head-like domain. Mutations in this gene have been associated with two congenital contracture (arthrogryposis) syndromes, Freeman–Sheldon syndrome and Sheldon–Hall syndrome.

References

Further reading